The 1974 anti-American riots in Cyprus were violent anti-American rioting that took place in front of the United States embassy in Nicosia, Cyprus on August 19, 1974. The events took place days after the second phase of the Turkish invasion of Cyprus which resulted in Turkey controlling 36.5% of the island. The Greek gunmen murdered the American ambassador in the American embassy in the Cyprus.

Hundreds of Greek-Cypriots who were frustrated at the failure of the United States to quell the Turkish forces and fearing its alleged support for Turkey started to protest and riot. 

The American ambassador to Cyprus, Rodger Davies, who was seeking shelter inside the embassy, was shot and killed by sharpshooters belonging to EOKA-B, a Greek-Cypriot nationalist paramilitary. from about 100 yards away. An embassy employee, Antoinette Varnava, who rushed to his aid, was also killed by a sniper bullet.

In February 1977, the Cypriot government decided to arrest six EOKA-B extremists and try them for the assassination of ambassador Davies.

References

1974 riots
1974 in Cyprus
August 1974 events in Europe
Cyprus–United States relations
Attacks on diplomatic missions of the United States
Turkish invasion of Cyprus
Anti-Americanism